Chong Long Fu from the Oak Ridge National Laboratory, was awarded the status of Fellow in the American Physical Society, after they were nominated by their Division of Materials Physics in 2008, for outstanding contributions to the fundamental understanding of the electronic, magnetic, and structural properties of metallic and intermetallic systems based on accurate first-principles calculations and to the development of novel high temperature intermetallics and nanocluster strengthened alloys for structural

References 

Fellows of the American Physical Society
American Physical Society
American physicists
Living people
Date of death missing
Year of birth missing (living people)